Quince (Cydonia oblonga) is a fruit tree.

Quince may also refer to:

Plants 
Pseudocydonia sinensis, a fruit tree known as Chinese quince
Chaenomeles, a genus of shrubs known as flowering quinces
Chaenomeles japonica, known as Japanese quince 
Chaenomeles speciosa, known as Chinese quince 
Aegle marmelos, known as Bengal quince
Wild quince, the common name of several plant species
 Alectryon subcinereus, an Australian tree in the family Sapindaceae
 Callicoma serratifolia, an Australian tree in the family Cunoniaceae
 Guioa semiglauca, an Australian tree in the family Sapindaceae

People 
 Khylee Quince, New Zealand lawyer and academic 
Peggy Quince (born 1948), Associate Justice of the Florida Supreme Court
 Peter Quince (fictional character), a carpenter that works in Athens in the romantic comedy A Midsummer Night's Dream
 Will Quince (born 1982), English Conservative Party politician, MP for Colchester since 2015
 Quince Duncan (born 1940), Spanish-language author from Costa Rica

Other uses 
"Quinces", an episode of One Day at a Time (2017 TV series)

See also

XV International Brigade, Republican army brigade in the Spanish Civil War
Quinceañera
Quince Orchard (disambiguation)
Quints
Quincy (disambiguation)